The 2016 World Outdoor Bowls Championship men's pairs  was held at the Burnside Bowling Club in Avonhead, Christchurch, New Zealand, from 29 November tp 4 December 2016.

The men's pairs gold medal went to Aaron Wilson and Brett Wilkie of Australia.

Section tables

Section 1

Section 2

Finals

Results

References

Men